Face the Heat is the twelfth studio album released by the German hard rock band Scorpions in 1993.

It was produced by the band and the late Bruce Fairbairn and released on the Mercury label. This album marked their status as a sort of political band with the song "Alien Nation", which was about the re-unification of Germany. This album had a contemporary touch to it, as the band were then going with the current trends, before later returning to their original style in Unbreakable in 2004. This is the last album to feature drummer Herman Rarebell, and the first with Ralph Rieckermann on bass guitar.

"Under the Same Sun" was played during the ending credits of the 1994 film On Deadly Ground.

"Alien Nation" was covered by the Italian heavy metal band Mastercastle, recorded by Pier Gonella at MusicArt Studios and released as Japanese bonus track of their album The Phoenix.

"Lonely Nights" was later included in the 2017 compilation album Born to Touch Your Feelings: Best of Rock Ballads.

Track listing

Personnel
Scorpions
Klaus Meine – lead vocals, backing vocals, arrangements on "Woman"
Rudolf Schenker – rhythm guitars, sitar, EBow, backing vocals
Matthias Jabs – lead guitars, talk box
Herman Rarebell – drums, percussion
Ralph Rieckermann – bass guitar

Additional musicians
John Webster – keyboards 
Luke Herzog – additional keyboards on "Woman" and "Lonely Nights", arrangements on "Woman"
Helen Donath – opera voice on "Ship of Fools"
 Rhian Gittins – girl's voice on "Nightmare Avenue"
Paul Laine, Mark LaFrance – backing vocals
Bruce Fairbairn, Mark Hudson – backing vocals on "Under the Same Sun"

Production
Bruce Fairbairn – producer, arrangements with Scorpions
Erwin Musper – engineer, mixing at Wisseloord Studios, Hilversum, Netherlands
Mike Plotnikoff – engineer
George Marino – mastering at Sterling Sound, New York
Hubert Kretzschmar – cover photography

Charts

Album

Singles

Certifications and sales

References 

1993 albums
Scorpions (band) albums
Albums produced by Bruce Fairbairn
Mercury Records albums